Isaac Bawa (born 24 April 1997) is a Ghanaian professional footballer who plays for Union Omaha.

Career

College and amateur

Azusa Pacific University
Bawa moved to the United States to play college soccer at Azusa Pacific in 2018, making 38 appearances, scoring 2 goals and tallying 1 assists in his two seasons with the Cougars.

FC Golden State Force
In 2019, Bawa appeared for USL League Two side FC Golden State Force.

Professional

LA Galaxy II
On 31 January 2020, Bawa signed for USL Championship side LA Galaxy II. Following the 2021 season, Bawa was released by the Galaxy.

References

1997 births
Living people
Association football defenders
Ghanaian footballers
Ghanaian expatriate footballers
Expatriate soccer players in the United States
Azusa Pacific Cougars men's soccer players
FC Golden State Force players
LA Galaxy II players
USL League Two players
USL Championship players
Union Omaha players
USL League One players